The canton of Gond-Pontouvre is an administrative division of the Charente department, southwestern France. Its borders were not modified at the French canton reorganisation which came into effect in March 2015. Its seat is in Gond-Pontouvre.

It consists of the following communes:
Balzac
Champniers
Gond-Pontouvre
Saint-Yrieix-sur-Charente

References

Cantons of Charente